Nomula Bhagath is an Indian politician who is serving as Member of Telangana Legislative Assembly from Nagarjuna Sagar Assembly constituency.

Personal life 
He was born in 10 October 1984 in Nalgonda. He is the son of Nomula Narsimhaiah and Nomula Laxmi.

References 

1984 births
Living people